Feltrinelli may refer to:

 Feltrinelli (publisher) (Giangiacomo Feltrinelli Editore), Italian publishing house
 Giangiacomo Feltrinelli (1926–1972), founder of the publishing house
 Inge Feltrinelli (1930–2018), photographer and widow of Giangiacomo Feltrinelli. She and her son Carlo (b. 1962) are directors of the publishing house.
 Feltrinelli Prize (Premio Feltrinelli), awarded by the Accademia Nazionale dei Lincei since 1950 in various fields of arts, sciences and "exceptional endeavours of outstanding moral and humanitarian value".
  (1887–1942), entrepreneur